The Songs That Built Rock Tour was a 2011–12 world concert tour by British hard rock band Deep Purple.

Overview
Along with the band, the tour featured a 38-piece orchestra. It was the first time Deep Purple toured North America in four years. It took place at the world's largest arenas, such as the O2 Arena in London and Arena di Verona in Verona, Italy.

The official management's press-release said the show would include Deep Purple's biggest hits, such as "Smoke on the Water", Highway Star", "Woman from Tokyo" etc, covering the 42-year history of the band.

Tour history

Announcements
The first few European dates of the orchestral tour were announced in January 2011, including shows in Germany and the Arena di Verona, Italy. It was billed as just "Orchestral Tour".
Billed as "Deep Purple: The Songs That Built Rock", the tour was officially announced at the end of February 2011, with North American dates being first, followed by European ones. The North American tour includes three show in Canada and three shows in the New York City area. (New York area concerts combine 20,000 tickets for sale.)
At the beginning of April, Jacky Paice, the wife of Deep Purple's drummer Ian Paice, announced the 2011 edition of The Sunflower Jam, the annual charity event hosted by the actor Jeremy Irons. This edition includes Deep Purple appearing at London's Royal Albert Hall among some of the biggest names in the history of rock, such as Jon Lord, Rick Wakeman, Keith Emerson, Joe Bonamassa, Neuton Faulkner and members of the rock band Thunder. (with more names to be confirmed, as promised). The Sunflower Jam has been criticised in the British Medical Journal for fundraising in support of The College of Medicine, an alternative medicine lobby group in the UK linked to Prince Charles.
12 April saw the band announcing four UK arena dates, including their first ever show at London's O2 Arena.

Ticket sales
 According to Ticketmaster, on 16 April Deep Purple reached #2 in the list of week's biggest ticket-selling artists in the UK. (Download Festival being #1). The band sold nearly 70,000 tickets in two days. The fourth day of ticket sales saw them as the #1 bestseller artists of the week in the UK.
 The LG Arena show in Birmingham sold out after one week of ticket sales.

Tour dates

Songs performed

{{hidden
| headercss = background: #ccccff; font-size: 100%; width: 55%;
| contentcss = text-align: left; font-size: 100%; width: 55%;
| header = North America 2011 (with orchestra)
| content = 
 "Deep Purple Overture" (performed by the Orchestra)
 "Highway Star" (from Machine Head)
 "Hard Lovin' Man" (from Deep Purple in Rock)
 "Maybe I'm a Leo" (from Machine Head) or "Silver Tongue" (from Bananas)  (4 June 2011 only)
 "Strange Kind of Woman" (From Fireball)
 "Rapture of the Deep" (From Rapture of the Deep)
 "Woman from Tokyo" (from Who Do We Think We Are)
 "Contact Lost" (from Bananas) 
 Steve Morse guitar solo
 "When a Blind Man Cries" (from Machine Head)
 "The Well-Dressed Guitar" (from Rapture of the Deep – Tour Edition)
 "Knocking at Your Back Door" (from Perfect Strangers)
 "Lazy" (from Machine Head)
 "No One Came" (from Fireball) 
 Don Airey Keyboard solo
 "Perfect Strangers" (from Perfect Strangers)
 "Space Truckin'" (from Machine Head)
 "Smoke on the Water" (from Machine Head)
Encore:
 "Green Onions" (Booker T. & the M.G.s cover) or "Going Down" (Don Nix cover) or "Time is Tight" (Booker T. & the M.G.s cover) or other covers intros to "Hush"
 "Hush"  (from Shades of Deep Purple) (Billy Joe Royal cover) (occasionally with a drum solo)
 Roger Glover bass solo
 "Black Night" (from Deep Purple in Rock)
}}

{{hidden
| headercss = background: #ccccff; font-size: 100%; width: 55%;
| contentcss = text-align: left; font-size: 100%; width: 55%;
| header = Europe 2011 (with orchestra) I
| content = 
 "Deep Purple Overture" (performed by the Orchestra)
 "Highway Star" (from Machine Head)
 "Hard Lovin' Man" (from Deep Purple in Rock)
 "Maybe I'm a Leo" (from Machine Head)
 "Strange Kind of Woman" (From Fireball)
 "Rapture of the Deep" (From Rapture of the Deep)
 "Woman from Tokyo" (from Who Do We Think We Are)
 "Contact Lost" (from Bananas) 
 Steve Morse guitar solo
 "When a Blind Man Cries" (from Machine Head)
 "The Well-Dressed Guitar" (from Rapture of the Deep – Tour Edition)
 "Knocking at Your Back Door" (from Perfect Strangers)
 "Lazy" (from Machine Head)
 "No One Came" (from Fireball) 
 Don Airey Keyboard solo
 "Perfect Strangers" (from Perfect Strangers)
 "Space Truckin'" (from Machine Head)
 "Smoke on the Water" (from Machine Head)
Encore:
 "Green Onions" (Booker T. & the M.G.s cover) or "Going Down" (Don Nix cover) or "Time is Tight" (Booker T. & the M.G.s cover) or other covers intros to "Hush"
 "Hush"  (from Shades of Deep Purple) (Billy Joe Royal cover) (occasionally with a drum solo)
 Roger Glover bass solo
 "Black Night" (from Deep Purple in Rock)
}}

{{hidden
| headercss = background: #ccccff; font-size: 100%; width: 55%;
| contentcss = text-align: left; font-size: 100%; width: 55%;
| header = South America 2011 (with orchestra)
| content = 
 "Deep Purple Overture" (performed by the Orchestra)
 "Highway Star" (from Machine Head)
 "Hard Lovin' Man" (from Deep Purple in Rock)
 "Maybe I'm a Leo" (from Machine Head)
 "Strange Kind of Woman" (From Fireball)
 "Rapture of the Deep" (From Rapture of the Deep)
 "Mary Long" or "Woman From Tokyo" (from Who Do We Think We Are)
 "Contact Lost" (from Bananas) 
 Steve Morse guitar solo
 "When a Blind Man Cries" (from Machine Head) or "Sometimes I Feel Like Screaming" (from Purpendicular)
 "The Well-Dressed Guitar" (from Rapture of the Deep – Tour Edition)
 "Knocking at Your Back Door" (from Perfect Strangers) or "Mary Long" (from Who Do We Think We Are)
 "Lazy" (from Machine Head)
 "No One Came" (from Fireball) 
 Don Airey Keyboard solo
 "Perfect Strangers" (from Perfect Strangers)
 "Space Truckin'" (from Machine Head)
 "Smoke on the Water" (from Machine Head)
Encore:
 "Green Onions" (Booker T. & the M.G.s cover) or "Going Down" (Don Nix cover) or "Time is Tight" (Booker T. & the M.G.s cover) or other covers intros to "Hush"
 "Hush"  (from Shades of Deep Purple) (Billy Joe Royal cover) (occasionally with a drum solo)
 Roger Glover bass solo
 "Black Night" (from Deep Purple in Rock)
}}

{{hidden
| headercss = background: #ccccff; font-size: 100%; width: 55%;
| contentcss = text-align: left; font-size: 100%; width: 55%;
| header = Europe 2011 (with orchestra) II
| content = 
 "Deep Purple Overture" (performed by the Orchestra)
 "Highway Star" (from Machine Head)
 "Hard Lovin' Man" (from Deep Purple in Rock)
 "Maybe I'm a Leo" (from Machine Head)
 "Strange Kind of Woman" (From Fireball)
 "Rapture of the Deep" (From Rapture of the Deep)
 "Woman from Tokyo" (from Who Do We Think We Are)
 "Contact Lost" (from Bananas) 
 Steve Morse guitar solo
 "When a Blind Man Cries" (from Machine Head)
 "The Well-Dressed Guitar" (from Rapture of the Deep – Tour Edition)
 "Knocking at Your Back Door" (from Perfect Strangers) or "The Mule" (From Fireball) (with Ian Paice drum solo)
 "Lazy" (from Machine Head)
 "No One Came" (from Fireball) 
 Don Airey Keyboard solo
 "Perfect Strangers" (from Perfect Strangers)
 "Space Truckin'" (from Machine Head)
 "Smoke on the Water" (from Machine Head)
Encore:
 "Green Onions" (Booker T. & the M.G.s cover) or "Going Down" (Don Nix cover) or "Time is Tight" (Booker T. & the M.G.s cover) or other covers intros to "Hush"
 "Hush" (from Shades of Deep Purple) (Billy Joe Royal cover) (occasionally with a drum solo)
 Roger Glover bass solo
 "Black Night" (from Deep Purple in Rock)
}}

{{hidden
| headercss = background: #ccccff; font-size: 100%; width: 55%;
| contentcss = text-align: left; font-size: 100%; width: 55%;
| header = Europe 2012 (without orchestra)
| content = 
 Intro tape: "Dance of the Knights" (Prokofiev, arr. by Don Airey)
 "Fireball" (From Fireball)
 "Into The Fire" (from Deep Purple in Rock)
 "Hard Lovin' Man" (from Deep Purple in Rock)
 "Maybe I'm a Leo" (from Machine Head)
 "Strange Kind of Woman" (From Fireball)
 "The Battle Rages On" (from The Battle Rages On...)
 "Contact Lost" (from Bananas)
 Steve Morse guitar solo
 "Wasted Sunsets" (from Perfect Strangers) or "Sometimes I Feel Like Screaming" (from Purpendicular) or "When a Blind Man Cries" (from Machine Head)
 "The Well-Dressed Guitar" (from Rapture of the Deep – Tour Edition)
 "The Mule" (From Fireball) (with Ian Paice drum solo)
 "Lazy" (from Machine Head)
 "No One Came" (From Fireball)
 Don Airey keyboard solo
 "Perfect Strangers" (from Perfect Strangers)
 "Space Truckin'" (from Machine Head)
 "Smoke on the Water" (from Machine Head)
Encore :
 "Highway Star" (from Machine Head) (first two gigs in Russia only) or "Speed King" (from Deep Purple in Rock) (in some shows at the end of the tour)
 "Green Onions" (Booker T. & the M.G.s cover) or "Going Down" (Don Nix cover) or "Time is Tight" (Booker T. & the M.G.s cover) or other cover intros to "Hush" (not for the shows where "Highway Star" or "Speed King" were played)
 "Hush" (Billy Joe Royal cover) (from Shades of Deep Purple)
 Roger Glover bass solo
 "Black Night" (from Deep Purple in Rock)
}}

Line-up

Deep Purple

 Ian Gillan – vocals
 Steve Morse – guitar
 Roger Glover – bass
 Ian Paice – drums
 Don Airey – keyboards

Other

 The 38-piece Orchestra, Europe tour: Neue Philharmonie Frankfurt
 The Sunflower Superjam 2011 line up includes Jon Lord, Rick Wakeman, Keith Emerson, Joe Bonamassa, Newton Faulkner, alongside Deep Purple

Notes

 Concord, California concert on 25 June 2011 is without the Orchestra, guest Joe Satriani plays the guitar on "Smoke on the Water"
 The SunFlower SuperJam concert on 8 July 2011 is without the orchestra and with guests Jack Moore, the son of Gary Moore on guitar, Bill Bailey on cowbell and Joe Bonamassa on guitar on "Smoke on the Water", Joe Bonamassa also played guitar on "Maybe I'm a Leo"
 Montreux, Switzerland concert on 16 July has been recorded and was released on DVD and CD as Live at Montreux 2011 on 7 November 2011
 The Słupsk concert "Rock Legends Festival" on 24 July 2011 is without the Orchestra
 The South American concerts in October 2011, the concerts in Canada in February 2012 and the final European Concerts in October, November and December 2012 were played without the orchestra.

References

Deep Purple concert tours
2011 concert tours
2012 concert tours